Son Nagar Junction is a railway station in Aurangabad district it serves Barun , Daudnagar  towns  of Bihar. It is located on the east bank of the Son River and was earlier known as Son East Bank.

History

The Upper Soane Bridge, connecting Son Nagar and Dehri-on-Sone across the Son River was completed in 1900. The  bridge was then the longest bridge in India. Work on the Grand Chord line of East Indian Railway was complete in 1901. It was formally inaugurated in 1907.

A branch line was opened from Son East Bank, as Son Nagar was then known, to Daltonganj in 1902.

Freight corridor
Son Nagar is expected to be connected with Ludhiana as part of the Eastern Corridor. The primary feeder routes for this will be from Son Nagar to Durgapur via Gomoh, Son Nagar to Tatanagar via Garhwa Road, and Barkakana to Bokaro via Chandrapura.

References

External links
 Map of Son Nagar Junction
 All train departures from Son Nagar Junction

Railway stations in Aurangabad district, Bihar
Railway junction stations in Bihar
Mughalsarai railway division
Railway stations opened in 1902